The Weber State Wildcats men's basketball team is the basketball team representing Weber State University in Ogden, Utah. The program is classified in the NCAA Division I, and is a member of the Big Sky Conference. The team last played in the NCAA Division I men's basketball tournament in 2016. The Wildcats are currently coached by Eric Duft.

Street & Smith ranked Weber State 51st in its 2005 list of the 100 greatest college basketball programs of all time, while Jeff Sagarin placed the program 116th in his 2009 all-time rankings in the ESPN College Basketball Encyclopedia.

With a winning percentage of .630, the Wildcats have the 27th highest winning percentage in Division I college basketball through the end of the 2018–19 season.

Season by season records

Updated through January 31, 2022

Postseason

NCAA tournament results
The Wildcats have appeared in 16 NCAA Tournaments, with a combined record of 6–17. Two of those wins are among the biggest upsets in NCAA Tournament history. In 1995, No. 14-seeded Weber State upset third-seeded Michigan State. 

In 1999, led by Harold Arceneaux, the Wildcats, again a No. 14 seed, faced perennial powerhouse North Carolina in the first round in Seattle. North Carolina was making its 25th consecutive NCAA appearance and had been to the Final Four two years in a row. The Wildcats were heavy underdogs against the Tar Heels, but controlled the game, leading for most of the second half. North Carolina had no answer for Arceneaux, who scored from everywhere on the floor and finished with 36 points (20 in the second half). Weber State led by 10 points with 3:59 left in the game, and went on to win 76–74. They were the first team to defeat the Tar Heels in the first round since first-round byes were eliminated in 1985. The Wildcats pushed Florida to overtime in the second round before losing 82–74. These were the deepest tournament runs by a Big Sky team since Idaho advanced to the Sweet 16 in 1982.

NIT results
The Wildcats have appeared in three National Invitation Tournaments (NIT), with a combined record of 1–3.

CBI results
The Wildcats have appeared in one College Basketball Invitational (CBI) and lost their opening game.

CIT results
The Wildcats have appeared in three CollegeInsider.com Postseason Tournaments (CIT), with a combined record of 6–3. They advanced to the championship game in 2013.

Honors and accolades

Retired numbers

Weber State players in the NBA/ABA
 Lance Allred (C), 2007–2008
 Harold Arceneaux (F), 2004–2005
 Larry Bergh (F), 1969–1970
 Joel Bolomboy (F), 2016–present
 Bob Davis (F), 1972–1973
 Eddie Gill (G), 2000–2009
 Damian Lillard (G), 2012–present
 Ruben Nembhard (G), 1996–1997
 Jeremy Senglin (G), 2017–present
 Willie Sojourner (F), 1971–1975 (ABA)
 Justus Thigpen (G), 1969–1974

References

External links